The men's lightweight event was part of the boxing programme at the 1992 Summer Olympics. The weight class allowed boxers of up to 60 kilograms to compete. The competition was held from 30 July to 8 August 1992. 29 boxers from 29 nations competed.

Medalists

Results
The following boxers took part in the event:

First round
 Namjilyn Bayarsaikhan (MGL) – BYE
 Mauricio Avila (GUA) – BYE
 Rashid Matumla (TAN) def. Felix Bwalya (ZAM), 16:8
 Julien Lorcy (FRA) def. Kamal Marjouane (MAR), 11:7
 Shigeyuki Dobashi (JPN) def. Delroy Leslie (JAM), 11:5
 Marco Rudolph (GER) def. Vasile Nistor (ROM), 10:5
 Dariusz Snarski (POL) def. Justin Rowsell (AUS), RSC-3
 Moses Odion (NGR) def. Janos Petrovics (HUN), 18:8
 Oscar De La Hoya (USA) def. Adilson Rosa Silva (BRA), RSC-3
 Henry Kungsi (PNG) def. Arshad Hussain (PAK), 13:9
 Tontcho Tontchev (BUL) def. Julio González Valladares (CUB), 14:12
 Artur Grigorian (EUN) def. Óscar Palomino (ESP), 11:10
 Hong Sung-Sik (KOR) def. Yong Chol Yun (PRK), 11:2
 Ronald Chavez (PHI) def. Emil Rizk (EGY), 18:10
 William Irwin (CAN) def. Alan Vaughan (GBR), RSCH 3rd round

Second round
 Namjilyn Bayarsaikhan (MGL) def. Mauricio Avila (GUA), 15:0
 Rashid Matumla (TAN) def. Jacobo Garcia (ISV), 12:2
 Julien Lorcy (FRA) def. Shigeyuki Dobashi (JPN), RSC-2
 Marco Rudolph (GER) def. Dariusz Snarski (POL), 10:1
 Oscar De La Hoya (USA) def. Moses Odion (NGR), 16:4
 Tontcho Tontchev (BUL) def. Henry Kungsi (PNG), 11:2
 Hong Sung-Sik (KOR) def. Artur Grigorian (EUN), 9:3
 Ronald Chavez (PHI) def. William Irwin (CAN), 8:1

Quarterfinals
 Namjilyn Bayarsaikhan (MGL) def. Rashid Matumla (TAN), 9:6
 Marco Rudolph (GER) def. Julien Lorcy (FRA), 13:10
 Oscar De La Hoya (USA) def. Tontcho Tontchev (BUL), 16:7
 Hong Sung-Sik (KOR) def. Ronald Chavez (PHI), KO-1

Semifinals
 Marco Rudolph (GER) def. Namjilyn Bayarsaikhan (MGL), WO
 Oscar De La Hoya (USA) def. Hong Sung-Sik (KOR), 11:10

Final
 Oscar De La Hoya (USA) def. Marco Rudolph (GER), 7:2

References

Lightweight